Lužná is a municipality and village in Rakovník District in the Central Bohemian Region of the Czech Republic. It has about 1,900 inhabitants.

Geography
The buil-up area lies in the Rakovník Uplands, but the eastern part of the municipal territory lies in the Křivoklát Highlands. Part of the municipality is situated in the Křivoklátsko Protected Landscape Area.

History
The first written mention of Lužná is from 1325, when it obtained a privilege from King John of Bohemia.

Sights
The Church of Saint Barbara is the landmark of the centre of Lužná. It is a valuable late Baroque church, built in 1750–1758. it replaced an old Gothic church from the first half of the 14th century.

The České dráhy Museum opened in 1999. It is located near the Lužná railway station and it is the largest railway museum in the Czech Republic.

JK Classics is a museum of American vintage cars. It was founded in 2015 and features 80 exhibits.

Gallery

References

External links

České dráhy Museum

Villages in Rakovník District